Vratnik, also known as Stari grad Vratnik (Стари град Вратник, English: The old Vratnik town), is one of the oldest neighbourhoods in Sarajevo, Bosnia and Herzegovina.

History and heritage

Developed by the Ottomans since 16th century, its core was redeveloped into in the fortified "walled city" in 18th century, after Prince Eugene of Savoy brief terror-raid into Ottoman-held Bosnia which culminated in sacking and burning of undefended open city of Sarajevo.

The "Walled city of Vratnik" lies within the wider neighbourhood of the same name and is designated as a national monument of Bosnia and Herzegovina since 2005.

Vratnik is of Slavic origin and is derived from the form Bratnik, which appears in the Turkish documents in the second half of the 15th century. Others believe, Vratnik name comes from the word "vrata" (gateway or door). The old Vratnik fort is associated with its location alongside the roads by which persons and goods entered the town from east at that time. The "Imperial Road" (Carska Džada), road from Sarajevo via Višegrad to Istanbul, led over Vratnik for centuries.

Vratnik is a tourist attraction primarily due to its old town architecture and Sarajevo city view lookouts.

Walled city of Vratnik

The Walled city of Vratnik lies within wider neighborhood of the same name and is designated as a national monument of Bosnia and Herzegovina since 2005.

Up until the brief but destating brief terror-raid of Prince Eugene of Savoy in 1697, when city was sacked and numerous buildings burnt and rest of the city severely damaged, Sarajevo was an open city. This tragic event prompted governor Ahmed-paša Rustempašić Skopljak in 1727, to order Vratnik town and most of its core to be redeveloped into the fortified "walled city".

Ahmed-paša brought five fortress architects from Dubrovnik to supervise the construction.  After it was completed in 1739, there were three tower-gates (Sirokac, Ploca and Visegrad) and five forts. Bijela/White and Zuta/Yellow fortresses are the most significant ones. 
According to his decree, the defense wall was supposed to be "one-hour walk long, two yards thick, and ten yards tall."

Legend has it that Vratnik got its name due to fact that it symbolised the "doors of Sarajevo". The fort doors, which were made out of oak wood, were closed at each sundown and again opened at sunrise. Sultan Mehmed Fatih entered through these doors and had a white mosque with sahat-kula that was built in his honor. He used White fortress as camp inside the old Vratnik town.

Many believe the fortress wall and the towers have always been the symbols of defense and freedom, while the Martyr’s Memorial nearby cemetery is a daily reminder on the price that was paid for it.

Gates and Towers

Višegradska kapija/Višegrad Gate 
Visegrad Gate was the main entry point to town and is one of the three gate-towers in the Vratnik Old Town (The old Vratnik fort) with the other two being Sirokac Tower and Ploca Tower. It was built between 1727 and 1739, in limestone and a special Bosnian stone "hreša" with roof shingles. Traffic went east via the main road towards Visegrad (thus the name) and continued further to the east towards Istanbul.

Širokac kapija/Širokac Gate and Tower
Širokac Gate is one of the three gate-towers in the Vratnik Old Town. Širokac Gate, part of the reconstructed portion of the old defense walls of Vratnik town in Sarajevo.

Ploča kapija/Ploča Gate and Tower
Ploca Tower is one of the three gate-towers in the Vratnik Old Town. The Alija Izetbegović Museum was opened on 19 October 2007 and is located in the Vratnik Kapija towers Ploča and Širokac. The museum is a commemoration to the influence and body of work of Alija Izetbegović, the first president of the Republic of Bosnia and Herzegovina. Visitors are able to walk from one tower to the next along the inside (atop) of fort walls.

Bastions

Yellow Fort 

Žuta Tabija (or Yellow Fort) is a cannon fort at Jekovac. It was built close to the Jajce Barracks and the Jekovac water reservoir. It served as one of the defense points against the Austro-Hungarian troops in 1878. The fortress was damaged and rebuilt several times. The most recent renovation took place in 1998.

White Fortress   

Bijela Tabija is a cannon bastion/fortress which also served to accommodate soldiers, and it is a part of the Old Town "Vratnik". It is assumed to have been built at the site of a small medieval town "Hodidjed" (central fortress of the Vrhbosna Parish). The fortress overlooks Sarajevo with the panoramic views of the eastern entrance to Sarajevo, the Miljacka River canyon and the city itself. The White Fortress was renovated and expanded several times. The present-day structure dates back to the Austro-Hungarian period. It served as a dungeon, barrack, munitions storage, a treasury, as well as the protection against the raid of Prince Eugene of Savoy in 1697, and defense fortress in battle against occupation by the Austro-Hungarian ruler in 1878. An esteemed local architect, Zlatko Ugljen has developed a conceptual reconstruction project. According to his idea where the site would be used as a theatre/music stage in the summer season. Some reports date the fortress to be built as far back as 1550.

Strošićki Bastion
Strošićka Tabija is located on the northwestern part of the Vratnik fort. Essentially the shape is trapezium, with the surface of 367m². Two parallel sides are 25 meters long and 14m, and the other two 18m and 21 meters. Strošićka bastion was built on steep terrain, and the preserved height of the walls on the northeastern side is 3m, and on the north 8m.

Bastion on Ravne Bakije
Tabija na Ravnim Bakijama is located in the far northern part of the fort, and the area is not easily accessible.

Bastion on Zmajevac
Tabija na Zmajevcu is also located in the far northern part of the fort, and the area is not easily accessible.

Vratnik perimeter walls

Other neighborhood features

Jajce kasarna/Jajce barracks

Jajce barracks is the name of the former Eugene of Savoy barracks in Sarajevo. Barracks were built in 1914 for the need of the Austro-Hungarian army, and name "Jajce Barracks" carries from 1915 when one Austro-Hungarian military hospital was moved to the Barracks.

See also

 Walled city of Jajce
 Walled town of Počitelj

References

National Monuments of Bosnia and Herzegovina
Populated places in Stari Grad, Sarajevo
Neighbourhoods in Grad Sarajevo